The 2016–17 Hong Kong Third Division League is the 3rd season of Hong Kong Third Division League since it became the fourth-tier football league in Hong Kong in 2014–15.

Teams

Changes from last season

From Third Division League
Promoted to Second Division League
 Central & Western
 Hoi King

Eliminated from league
 HKFYG
 Kowloon Cricket Club

To Third Division League
Relegated from Second Division League
 Tsuen Wan
 Happy Valley

League table

References

Hong Kong Third Division League seasons